Královka Arena or Královka sports Hall (Czech: Sportovní hala Královka) is multipurpose hall located in Prague 7 district Letná, near to the Generali Arena. Sports and cultural events are held there. It has capacity for maximum 2500 people, 1300 without additional tribune. It can host sports as basketball, badminton or floorball. In this complex, training ground with capacity of 200 people is included.

Since 2014, it is home to women basketball team USK Praha and VŠ Praha. Basketball Nymburk also plays its major international matches in this arena.

History 
This arena in Pod Královskou oborou street was built in 1965, by the Czech architect Cyril Mandel. The first reconstruction started in 1985 and ended five years later. Next reconstruction took place in 2004. In 2010, Prague bought this arena for 116 million Czech crowns. Since 2011, the hall is rented by company Sportovní areál Praha. Between 2011 and 2014, another reconstruction took place, at a cost of 240 million Czech crowns.

Events 
 2015 EuroLeague Women final 
 EuroBasket Women 2017 (one of the three locations, others were O2 Arena Prague and Zimní stadion Hradec Králové, Group Phase and Qualification for quarter-finals were held here)

External links 

 Official website (in Czech)

Sports venues completed in 1965
Sports venues in Prague
Basketball venues in the Czech Republic
Indoor arenas in the Czech Republic
1965 establishments in Czechoslovakia
20th-century architecture in the Czech Republic